The Tom Bowl is a fan-supported college football bowl game scheduled to be played annually at Frank A. Schafer Field in Beal City, Michigan. The game is not sanctioned by the NCAA. It annually invites the #1 and #2 teams in the nation to play in a college football championship game. Although the group formally invites college teams every year to play in the bowl, no school has ever accepted an invitation. However, some athletic directors and conference presidents/commissioners have sent response letters, declining while sarcastically telling the group that it was an honor to be invited. Responses have been received from Jim Delany, Jack Swarbrick, and Pat Richter, among others. 

The Tom Bowl started in 1989 by a group of fans with invitations extended to the University of Colorado and the University of Miami. Colorado declined the invitation and alternate teams of Middle Tennessee State and Eastern Michigan were invited. From 1990 to 2006, the Tom Bowl annually invited the top two teams unless those teams played each other in another bowl game. In those years the Tom Bowl has elected to have alternative games such as a battle between the #3 and #4 teams to determine the "true #2" or as in 2002, the Big Ten Championship when Iowa and Ohio State didn't play during the regular season.

Following the 2005 season, the Tom Bowl broke with tradition and used a BCS-like formula to invite three teams: USC, Texas, and Penn State to play in Tom Bowl XVII. Predictably, none of the teams showed up (though the Pac-10 replied, apparently accepting the invitation but pledging not to show up on behalf of USC) and only twelve spectators did. The game was declared a 0-0-0 tie.

In 2007, the Tom Bowl devised a new format where the top three teams were invited to play in a round-robin tournament style game with each team playing each other for a half. The Tom Bowl has used this formula ever since, although in 2009 invites were extended to six different teams including Emory University, which boasts of being undefeated since 1836 because they do not have a football team. The Tom Bowl returned to the three team format in 2010.

Tom Bowl Game-by-Game Results

1989 Middle Tennessee St. 0; Eastern Michigan 0*

1990 University of Colorado ?; Notre Dame ?

1991 University of Washington 0; University of Miami 0

1992 Florida St. 0; University of Miami 0

1993 Florida St. 0; West Virginia 0

1994 University of Nebraska 0; Penn St. 0

1995 University of Nebraska 0; Northwestern 0

1996 Arizona State University 0; Florida St. 0

1997 University of Nebraska 0; University of Michigan 0

1998 Kansas State University 0; Ohio State University 0+

1999 University of Nebraska 0; University of Wisconsin 0&

2000 University of Oklahoma 0; University of Miami 0

2001 University of Miami 0; University of Colorado 0

2002 University of Iowa 0; Ohio State 0@

2003 University of Southern California 0; Louisiana State University 0

2004 University of Southern California 0; University of Oklahoma 0; Auburn University 0%

2005 University of Southern California 0; University of Texas 0; Penn State University 0

2006 University of Michigan 0; Ohio State University 0

2007 University of Hawaii 0; University of Kansas 0; Ohio State University 0

2008 University of Florida 0; University of Oklahoma 0; University of Texas 0^

2009 University of Alabama 0; University of Texas 0; University of Cincinnati 0; Texas Christian University 0; Boise State University 0; Emory 0

2010 University of Oregon 0; Auburn University 0; Texas Christian University 0

2011  Louisiana State 0; Oklahoma State 0; University of Oregon 0

2012 Notre Dame 0; Alabama 0; Stanford 0

2013 Florida St. 0; Auburn 0; Michigan State 0

2014 Florida St. 0; Oregon 0; Alabama 0

2015 Alabama 0; Clemson 0; Michigan State 0

2016 Alabama 0; Clemson 0; Washington 0

2017 Oklahoma 0; Clemson 0; Georgia 0

* 1989 contest featured alternates after Colorado declined an invitation to face Miami-FL.
+ 1998 contest featured #3 OSU vs #4 Kansas State due to Fiesta Bowl (#1 Tenn. vs #2 FSU)
& 1999 contest featured #3 Nebraska vs #4 Wisconsin due to Sugar Bowl (#1 FSU vs #2 Virginia Tech)
@ 2002 contest featured the Big 10 championship due to #1 Miami vs #2 OSU. (Iowa and OSU did not play each other during regular season.)
% 2004 Three way contest between three undefeated teams
^ 2007 Undefeated (Hawaii) vs. Once-Defeated (Kansas and Ohio State)

External links
http://www.tombowl.com
http://sportsillustrated.cnn.com/2004/writers/pete_mcentegart/12/09/ten.spot/index.html
http://findarticles.com/p/articles/mi_m1208/is_/ai_n15955997
https://web.archive.org/web/20110523040040/http://www.dispatch.com/live/content/football/stories/2007/12/20/gameplan1220.ART_ART_12-20-07_C2_K58R1MV.html?sid=101

College football bowls
Recurring sporting events established in 1989